Westray may mean:

 The Orkney islands of Westray or Papa Westray
 Westray Mine in Nova Scotia
 "Westray", a song by Weeping Tile on their album Cold Snap (album) and EP eepee, about the Westray Mine incident
 Ron Westray, jazz trombonist